Sidestep may refer to:

 Avoidance behavior
 SideStep, a travel Internet search engine
 Side-slipping, in jazz music